In Norse mythology, Brísingamen (or Brísinga men) is the torc or necklace of the goddess Freyja. The name is an Old Norse compound brísinga-men whose second element is men "(ornamental) neck-ring (of precious metal), torc". The etymology of the first element is uncertain. It has been derived from Old Norse brísingr, a poetic term for "fire" or "amber" mentioned in the anonymous versified word-lists (þulur) appended to many manuscripts of the Prose Edda, making Brísingamen "gleaming torc", "sunny torc", or the like. However, Brísingr can also be an ethnonym, in which case Brísinga men is "torque of the Brísings"; the Old English parallel in Beowulf supports this derivation, though who the Brísings (Old Norse Brísingar) may have been remains unknown.

Attestations

Beowulf
Brísingamen is referred to in the Anglo-Saxon epic Beowulf as Brosinga mene. The brief mention in Beowulf is as follows (trans. by Howell Chickering, 1977):

The Beowulf  poet is clearly referring to the legends about Theoderic the Great. The Þiðrekssaga tells that the warrior Heime (Háma in Old English) takes sides against Ermanaric ("Eormanric"), king of the Goths, and has to flee his kingdom after robbing him; later in life, Hama enters a monastery and gives them all his stolen treasure. However, this saga makes no mention of the great necklace.

Poetic Edda
In the poem Þrymskviða of the Poetic Edda, Þrymr, the king of the jǫtnar, steals Thor's hammer, Mjölnir. Freyja lends Loki her falcon cloak to search for it; but upon returning, Loki tells Freyja that Þrymr has hidden the hammer and demanded to marry her in return. Freyja is so wrathful that all the Æsir’s halls beneath her are shaken and the necklace Brísingamen breaks off from her neck. Later Thor borrows Brísingamen when he dresses up as Freyja to go to the wedding at Jǫtunheimr.

Prose Edda
Húsdrápa, a skaldic poem partially preserved in the Prose Edda, relates the story of the theft of Brísingamen by Loki. One day when Freyja wakes up and finds Brísingamen missing, she enlists the help of Heimdallr to help her search for it. Eventually they find the thief, who turns out to be Loki who has transformed himself into a seal. Heimdallr turns into a seal as well and fights Loki. After a lengthy battle at Singasteinn, Heimdallr wins and returns Brísingamen to Freyja.

Snorri Sturluson quoted this old poem in Skáldskaparmál, saying that because of this legend Heimdallr is called "Seeker of Freyja's Necklace" (Skáldskaparmál, section 8) and Loki is called "Thief of Brísingamen" (Skáldskaparmál, section 16). A similar story appears in the later Sörla þáttr, where Heimdallr does not appear.

Sörla þáttr
Sörla þáttr is a short story in the later and extended version of the Saga of Olaf Tryggvason in the manuscript of the Flateyjarbók, which was written and compiled by two Christian priests, Jon Thordson and Magnus Thorhalson, in the late 14th century. In the end of the story, the arrival of Christianity dissolves the old curse that traditionally was to endure until Ragnarök.

The battle of Högni and Heðinn is recorded in several medieval sources, including the skaldic poem Ragnarsdrápa, Skáldskaparmál (section 49), and Gesta Danorum: king Högni's daughter, Hildr, is kidnapped by king Heðinn. When Högni comes to fight Heðinn on an island, Hildr comes to offer her father a necklace on behalf of Heðinn for peace; but the two kings still battle, and Hildr resurrects the fallen to make them fight until Ragnarök. None of these earlier sources mentions Freyja or king Olaf Tryggvason, the historical figure who Christianized Norway and Iceland in the 10th Century.

Archaeological record

A Völva was buried  with considerable splendour in Hagebyhöga in Östergötland, Sweden. In addition to being buried with her wand, she had received great riches which included horses, a wagon and an Arabian bronze pitcher. There was also a silver pendant, which represents a woman with a broad necklace around her neck. This kind of necklace was only worn by the most prominent women during the Iron Age and some have interpreted it as Freyja's necklace Brísingamen. The pendant may represent Freyja herself.

Modern influence
Alan Garner wrote a children's fantasy novel called The Weirdstone of Brisingamen, published in 1960, about an enchanted teardrop bracelet.

Diana Paxson's novel Brisingamen features Freyja and her bracelet.

Black Phoenix Alchemy Lab has a perfumed oil scent named Brisingamen.

Freyja's necklace Brisingamen features prominently in Betsy Tobin's novel Iceland, where the necklace is seen to have significant protective powers.

The Brisingamen feature as a major item in Joel Rosenberg's Keepers of the Hidden Ways series of books. In it, there are seven jewels that were created for the necklace by the Dwarfs and given to the Norse goddess. She in turn eventually split them up into the seven separate jewels and hid them throughout the realm, as together they hold the power to shape the universe by its holder. The book's plot is about discovering one of them and deciding what to do with the power they allow while avoiding Loki and other Norse characters.

In Christopher Paolini's Inheritance Cycle, the word "brisingr" means fire. This is probably a distillation of the word brisinga.

Ursula Le Guin's short story Semley's Necklace, the first part of her novel Rocannon's World, is a retelling of the Brisingamen story on an alien planet.

Brisingamen is represented as a card in the Yu-Gi-Oh! Trading Card Game, "Nordic Relic Brisingamen".

Brisingamen was part of MMORPG Ragnarok Online lore, which is ranked as "God item". The game is heavily based from Norse mythology.

In the Firefly Online game, one of the planets of the Himinbjörg system (which features planets named after figures from Germanic mythology) is named Brisingamen.  It is third from the star, and has moons named Freya, Beowulf, and Alberich.

The Brisingamen is an item that can be found and equipped in the video game, Castlevania: Lament of Innocence.

In the French comics Freaks' Squeele, the character of Valkyrie accesses her costume change ability by touching a decorative torque necklace affixed to her forehead, named Brizingamen.

See also
 Rings in Germanic cultures 
 Necklace of Harmonia, a necklace owned by the Greek goddess Harmonia, a daughter of Aphrodite.

References 

Artifacts in Norse mythology
Freyja
Torcs
Mythological clothing
Individual necklaces